In finance, flow trading occurs when a firm trades stocks, bonds, currencies, commodities, their derivatives, or other financial instruments, with funds from a client, rather than its own funds.

Flow trading can be a significant source of profits for investment banks. Engaging in flow trading can also boost a firm's own proprietary trading profits via access to information on client activities. Additionally, the firm can often facilitate client trades by serving as the counterparty, thus profiting from the bid–offer spread.

In 2011, the Volcker Rule aimed to limit flow trading businesses from taking proprietary bets.

References

Corporate finance